Tapejara (from a Tupi word meaning "the old being") is a genus of Brazilian pterosaur from the Cretaceous Period (Santana Formation, dating to about 127 to 112 million years ago). Tapejara crests consisted of a semicircular crest over the snout, and a bony prong which extended back behind the head.

Species and classification

The type species and only one currently recognized as valid by most researchers, is T. wellnhoferi. The specific name honors German paleontologist Peter Wellnhofer. Two larger species, originally named Tapejara imperator and Tapejara navigans, were later classified in the genus Tapejara. However, several studies have shown that T. imperator and T. navigans are significantly different from T. wellnhoferi and therefore were reclassified into new genera. The species T. imperator was given its own genus, Tupandactylus, by Alexander Kellner and Diogenes de Almeida Campos. Unwin and Martill found that T. imperator and T. navigans belong in the same genus, and named them Ingridia imperator and I. navigans, respectively. This genus name honored Wellnhofer's late wife Ingrid. 

Because Tupandactylus was named first, it retained priority over the name Ingridia. To complicate matters, both the name Tupandactylus and Ingridia used the former Tapejara imperator as their type species. The scientists who described Tupandactylus did not name a Tupandactylus navigans (but instead suggested it was synonymous to Tupandactylus imperator), and Tapejara navigans was not formally reclassified as a distinct species of Tupandactylus until 2011.

 
The cladogram below follows a phylogenetic analysis by Kellner, the describer of Tapejara, and colleagues in 2019. They recovered Tapejara within the Tapejarini (a tribe within the family Tapejaridae), sister taxon to three other genera: Europejara, Caiuajara, and Tupandactylus.

Paleobiology
Comparisons between the scleral rings of Tapejara and modern birds and reptiles suggest that it may have been cathemeral, active throughout the day at short intervals.

See also
 List of pterosaur genera
 Timeline of pterosaur research

References 

Tapejaromorphs
Early Cretaceous pterosaurs of South America
Albian life
Aptian life
Cretaceous Brazil
Fossils of Brazil
Romualdo Formation
Fossil taxa described in 1989
Taxa named by Alexander Kellner
Tupi–Guarani languages